David Donato may refer to:

 David Donato (singer), American singer for White Tiger and Black Sabbath
 David Donato (footballer) (born 1970), Australian rules footballer